Char siu is a Chinese–specifically Cantonese–style of barbecued pork. Originating in Guangdong, it is eaten with rice, used as an ingredient for noodle dishes or in stir fries, and as a filling for chasiu baau or pineapple buns. Five-spice powder is the primary spice, honey or other sweeteners are used as a glaze, and the characteristic red color comes from the red yeast rice when made traditionally.

It is classified as a type of siu mei, Cantonese roasted meat.

Meat cuts
Pork cuts used for char siu can vary, but a few main cuts are common:

 Pork loin
 Pork belly – produces juicy and fatter char siu
 Pork butt (shoulder) – produces leaner char siu
 Pork fat 
 Pork neck end – very marbled (jyu geng yuk)

Cantonese cuisine

Char siu literally means "fork roasted"   (siu being burn/roast and cha being fork, both noun and verb) after the traditional cooking method for the dish: long strips of seasoned boneless pork are skewered with long forks and placed in a covered oven or over a fire.

In ancient times, wild boar and other available meats were used to make char siu. However, in modern times, the meat is typically a shoulder cut of domestic pork, seasoned with a mixture of honey, five-spice powder, red fermented bean curd, dark soy sauce, hoisin sauce, red food colouring (not a traditional ingredient but very common in today's preparations and is optional), and sherry or rice wine (optional). These seasonings turn the exterior layer of the meat dark red, similar to the "smoke ring" of American barbecues. Maltose may be used to give char siu its characteristic shiny glaze.

Char siu is typically consumed with a starch, whether inside a bun (chasiu baau, 叉燒包), with noodles (chasiu min, 叉燒麵), or with rice (chasiu faan, 叉燒飯) in fast food establishments, or served alone as a centerpiece or main dish in traditional family dining establishments. If it is purchased outside of a restaurant, it is usually taken home and used as one ingredient in various complex main courses consumed at family meals.

Hong Kong cuisine
The ovens used to roast char siu are usually large gas rotisseries. Since ovens are not standard in Hong Kong households, char siu is usually purchased from a siu mei establishment, which specialises in meat dishes such as char siu, soy sauce chicken, white cut chicken, roasted goose, and roasted pork. These shops usually display the merchandise by hanging them in the window.

Southeast Asian cuisine 

In Malaysia, Singapore, Indonesia, Cambodia, Thailand, and Vietnam, char siew rice is found in many Chinese shāolà stalls along with roast duck and roast pork. The dish consists of slices of char siu, cucumbers, white rice and is drenched in sweet gravy or drizzled with dark soy sauce. Char siu rice is also a popular food within the Chinese community in Medan, North Sumatra, where it is more called char sio. 

In Singapore, char siew rice can also be found in Hainanese chicken rice stalls, where customers have a choice of having their char siu rice served with plain white rice or chicken-flavoured rice, and choose from garlic, chilli and soy sauces. 

In Thailand, char siu is called mu daeng ("red pork") and in Cambodia it is called sach chrouk sa seev.

In the Philippines, it is known as Chinese pork asado, but also referred to as cha siu. It is usually eaten with cold cuts or served stuffed in siopao. 

In Flanders and Holland, it is sometimes mistaken for the Chinese/Indonesian name 'babi pangang'. This is a different dish (mostly sweeter and served with yellow pickled Chinese cabbage, called atjar). In fact, these Chinese/Indo restaurants serve cha(r) sieuw under the original name. These restaurants in the Netherlands derived from Chinese immigrants and are made to adapt to the Dutch palate.

Vegetarian char siu also exists, usually made from wheat gluten. It can be found in vegetarian restaurants and stalls in South East Asian Chinese communities.

Japanese cuisine

Japanese culture has adapted 叉燒 as chāshū (チャーシュー). Unlike its Chinese variant, it is prepared by rolling the meat into a log and then braising it at a low temperature. The Japanese adaptation is typically seasoned with soy sauce, sake, mirin and sugar or other sweetener, without the red food colouring, or five-spice powder. It is a typical ingredient for toppings in rāmen.

Pacific Rim cuisine

As a means of exceptional flavor and preparation, char siu applications extend beyond pork. In Hawaii, various meats are cooked char siu style. The term char siu refers to meats which have been marinated in char siu seasoning prepared either from scratch or from store-bought char siu seasoning packages, then roasted in an oven or over a fire. Ingredients in marinades for cha siu are similar to those found in China (honey, five-spice, wine, soy, hoisin, etc.), except that red food colouring is often used in place of the red bean curd for convenience. Char siu is used to marinate and prepare a variety of meats which can either be cooked in a conventional or convection oven (often not requiring the use of a fork or cha(zi) as traditional Chinese ovens do), on a standard barbecue, or even in an underground Hawaiian imu. In Hawaii, char siu chicken is as common as char siu pork, and various wild birds, mountain goat, and wild boar are also often cooked char siu style, as are many sausages and skewers.

See also

Asado
List of pork dishes
Red cooking

References

Cantonese cuisine
Cantonese words and phrases
Dim sum
Hawaiian cuisine
Hong Kong cuisine
Indonesian Chinese cuisine
Japanese cuisine
Malaysian cuisine
Singaporean cuisine
Polynesian Chinese cuisine
French Polynesian cuisine
Grilled skewers
Thai cuisine
Chinese pork dishes